Digital Currency Group (DCG) is a venture capital company focusing on the digital currency market. It is located in Stamford, Connecticut. The company has five subsidiaries: CoinDesk, Foundry, Genesis, Grayscale Investments, and Luno.

History 
Digital Currency Group was launched in 2015 by Barry Silbert, the former CEO of SecondMarket, Inc. He began investing in blockchain technology companies in 2013. Shortly after SecondMarket’s sale, Silbert formed Digital Currency Group, with Genesis and Grayscale becoming the first of the company’s subsidiaries.

In November 2021, the firm announced it would relocate its Manhattan headquarters to Stamford, Connecticut. The governor of Connecticut at the time, Ned Lamont, provided financial incentives for the company to move to Stamford, including a $5 million grant if Digital Currency Group created at least 300 full-time jobs in the state.

As of November 2021, Digital Currency Group made over 200 investments in other cryptocurrency companies.

Subsidiaries

Genesis Global Capital

Genesis is a cryptocurrency trading, lending, and asset custody platform, targeting institutional clients and high net worth individuals. They claim to have been the first Bitcoin cryptocurrency desk, launched in 2013.

Genesis acquired the London-based cryptocurrency custodial company Volt in early 2020. Genesis' sister company Grayscale Investments had been holding its cryptocurrency assets with the company Xapo, which had been acquired by Genesis' rival Bitcoin trading company Coinbase in 2019. News media speculated that Genesis' cryptocurrency custody would be transferred away from Coinbase and made internal to Greyscale after completion of the Volt acquisition.

In late June and early July 2022, Genesis publicly disclosed that it was exposed to hundreds of millions of dollars in losses from loans to both the Hong Kong based cryptocurrency lender Babel Finance and the bankrupt cryptocurrency hedge fund Three Arrows Capital (3AC), and that its parent company DCG had taken on some of Genesis' debts in order to keep the company afloat. On August 17, 2022, CEO Michael Moro resigned from his position. Genesis Trading announced that he would be serving in an advisory position to help with the transition while COO Derar Islim took over his duties as interim CEO.

On January 19, 2023, Genesis Global Capital, Genesis Global Holdco and Genesis Asia Pacific filed for Chapter 11 bankruptcy protection, citing over 100,000 creditors and liabilities of between $1 billion and $10 billion.

On February 6, 2023, Genesis Global Holdco announced an agreement in principle with DCG and creditors of Genesis Global Capital. The agreement, which is subject to bankruptcy court approval, will see DCG give its equity interest in Genesis Global Trading (GGT) to Genesis Global Holdco. DCG will also refinance its loans from Genesis and exchange its existing $1.1 billion promissory note for convertible preferred stock issued by DCG.

Grayscale Investments 

Established in 2013, Grayscale Investments is a digital currency asset manager. It offers funds privately for institutional and accredited investors and publicly-traded products. Grayscale was the world’s largest asset manager for digital currency, as of December 2021, with more than $50 billion in assets under management. Grayscale also manages the Grayscale Bitcoin Investment Trust, which was the first publicly quoted security solely invested in the price of bitcoin upon its launch in 2013. 

As of April 2021, six of Grayscale’s funds were traded publicly on the OTCQX market: Bitcoin Cash, Grayscale Bitcoin Trust, Grayscale Ethereum Trust, Grayscale Ethereum Classic Trust, Grayscale Digital Large Cap Fund, and the Grayscale Litecoin Trust.

Grayscale Bitcoin Trust was approved for public trading by the U.S. Financial Industry Regulatory Authority (FINRA) in 2015. On January 21, 2020, Grayscale Bitcoin Trust became the first digital currency financial product to become a Securities and Exchange Commission reporting company.

In 2018, Grayscale launched the Grayscale Digital Large Cap Fund which allows a customer to invest in a group of prominent digital currencies. The fund was approved to trade on public markets by the FINRA in October 2019. In May 2022, it was reported that Grayscale would list an exchange-traded fund (ETF) for the first time in Europe. The ETF was said to be made up of companies representing the "Future of Finance", and would begin trading on May 17.

CoinDesk 

CoinDesk is a global media, research, and events platform that was acquired by Digital Currency Group in 2016. It reports on bitcoin blockchain daily news, provides a bitcoin price index and publishes a quarterly State of Bitcoin report. CoinDesk also hosts a conference on digital currencies and blockchain technologies named Consensus.

Foundry 
Foundry, established in 2019, sets up and manages bitcoin mining operations in the United States and Canada. In addition to setting up and operating its own cryptocurrency mining equipment, Foundry also provides financing, specialized digital mining equipment, and expertise to other digital currency startups. 

In the summer of 2021, Foundry helped to relocate over $300 million worth of equipment from China to North America following the Chinese government shutdown of many cryptocurrency mining operations.

Luno 
In September 2020 Digital Currency Group acquired Luno, a cryptocurrency exchange based in London, with other operations in Cape Town and Singapore. At the time of the acquisition, Luno had more than 5 million customers.

Repercussions of FTX bankruptcy 

On November 10, 2022, DCG subsidiary Genesis Trading posted to their official Twitter feed that they had lost approximately $175 million dollars in the bankruptcy of FTX caused by the bankruptcy of Bahamas-based cryptocurrency exchange FTX. The company claimed that "This does not impact our market-making activities." On November 16, 2022, DCG subsidiary Genesis Global Capital suddenly halted all Bitcoin withdrawals and loan applications for their customers. On November 17, 2022, the Wall Street Journal reported that it had obtained confidential documents stating that Genesis was undergoing an "ongoing run on deposits" and a $1 billion emergency loan by the following Monday, November 21.

See also 
 List of bitcoin companies

References

External links 
 

Digital currency exchanges
Bitcoin exchanges
Bitcoin companies
American companies established in 2015
Financial services companies established in 2015
Companies based in Connecticut
Companies based in Stamford, Connecticut